Holmes High School may refer to:

 Holmes Junior/Senior High School in Covington, Kentucky
 John A. Holmes High School in Edenton, North Carolina

See also
 Oliver Wendell Holmes High School, San Antonio, Texas